Albert Tremmell Evans (born October 16, 1989) is a former American football safety. He was signed as an undrafted free agent following the 2012 NFL Draft. He played college football at Purdue.

Early life
Evans attended Portage High School in Portage, Indiana While there, Evans participated in football, basketball and track and field. As a member of the football team, Evans played as a running back in high school under head coach Craig Buzea. His junior year, Evans rushed for 1,603 yards and 12 touchdowns. His senior season he rushed for 743 yards on 177 carries (4.2 average), had 18 receptions for 216 yards (12.0 average), while also returning two punts 43 and 57 yards for touchdowns.

Evans committed to Purdue University on July 10, 2007. Evans also received scholarship offers from Akron, Cincinnati, Duke, Illinois, Indiana and Northern Illinois.

Professional career
On April 29, 2012, Evans signed as an undrafted free agent with the Miami Dolphins.

Evans has been an active campaigner of the #retire32 movement. As President of #retire32, he has made it known that 32 belongs in the Portage, Purdue, and National Football League Hall of fame.

References

External links 
 Purdue Boilermakers bio

1989 births
Living people
Players of American football from Gary, Indiana
American football defensive backs
Purdue Boilermakers football players
Miami Dolphins players
People from Portage, Indiana